The New York City mayoral election of 1985 occurred on Tuesday, November 5, 1985, with Democratic incumbent Mayor Ed Koch being re-elected to a third term by a landslide margin.

Koch received an overwhelming 78.02% of the vote citywide. Koch also swept all five boroughs by landslide margins, breaking 70% of the vote in Manhattan and Queens and breaking 80% of the vote in Brooklyn, the Bronx, and Staten Island.

Koch's closest competitor was the Liberal Party nominee, New York City Council President Carol Bellamy, who received 10.20% of the vote. Finishing in a distant third was the Republican nominee, Diane McGrath, who received 9.14% of the vote.

Koch defeated his nearest competitor by a landslide 67.82% Democratic margin of victory and was sworn into his third and final term in January 1986.  

Al Vann and Herman Badillo tried to unite the Black and Puerto Rican communities but were thwarted by the Gang of Four, "But in a move that shocked Vann, the so-called “Gang of Four” from Harlem–Charles Rangel, David Dinkins, Basil Paterson and Percy Sutton–broke ranks and put forth their own candidate for mayor, Harlem Assemblyman Herman “Denny” Farrell, a dark horse if ever there was one. They argued that a black group like the Coalition for a Just New York should support a black candidate, not a Puerto Rican. Badillo bitterly withdrew from consideration. Farrell lost badly in the primary."

As of 2022, this is the last time a Democrat won Staten Island in a mayoral election.

Results

The Koch vote include 862,226 Democratic and 6,034 Independent votes. The McGrath vote was 79,508 Republican and 22,160 Conservative.
Other vote was: Yehuda Levin - Right to Life - 14,517; Lenora Fulani - New Alliance - 7,597;Jarvis Tyner - People Before Profits - 3,370; Andrea Gonzalez - Socialist Workers - 1,677; Gilbert DiLucia - Coalition - 1,135; Marjorie Stanberg - Spartacist - 1,101; Scattered - 9

Koch won the Democratic Primary: Koch-436,151 64.0%; Bellamy - 127,690 18.7%; Denny Farrell - 89,845 13.2%; DiLucia - 11, 627 1.7%; Fred Newman - 8,584 1.2%;
Judah Rubenstein - 8,057 1.2%

References

Mayoral election, 1985
1985
New York City mayoral
New York